Lomatium parryi, commonly known as Parry's biscuitroot and Utah desertparsley, is a perennial herb in the carrot family. It is a common herb in high altitude areas of deserts and common in desert National parks, such as Death Valley mountains, in the western part of the United States.

The species epithet parryi honors Charles Christopher Parry (1823-1890), the first official botanist for the U.S. Department of Agriculture and a collector with the Pacific Railway Survey.

Description
Lomatium parryi is a plant that grows from a taproot. The flowering stems are usually stout or and with hollow internodes. The plant grows 20 to 40 centimeters tall. The hairy, basal leaves are divided into many small segments. The yellow flowers are borne in an umbel only one or two centimeters wide. Like most other plants, the flowers are pollinated by insects.

The fruits are schizocarp, which are flat and wide with lateral wings. They split into two halves, each one seeded.

Uses
Lomatium parryi is a plant that was consumed by early Native Americans.

External links

Jepson Manual Treatment
USDA Plants Profile
Arches National Park, 2007 from National Park Service (NPS)
Photo gallery

Edible Apiaceae
Flora of the California desert regions
Flora of the Southwestern United States
Flora of Nevada
Plants used in Native American cuisine
Natural history of the Mojave Desert
North American desert flora
Herbs
Taxa named by Sereno Watson
Flora without expected TNC conservation status